Henricus Cockuyt (14 July 1903 – 3 December 1993) was a Belgian sprinter. He competed in the men's 100 metres event at the 1924 Summer Olympics.

References

External links
 

1903 births
1993 deaths
Athletes (track and field) at the 1924 Summer Olympics
Belgian male sprinters
Olympic athletes of Belgium